The following is a list of episodes of The Nightly Show with Larry Wilmore hosted by Larry Wilmore from 2016.

2016

January

February

March

April

May

June

July

August

References

External links 

 
 

2016
2016 American television seasons
Lists of American non-fiction television series episodes